FEA or Fea may refer to:

Organizations
 Far Eastern Air Transport (ICAO code), a Taiwanese airline
 Fellow of the English Association, a post-nominal from the English Association

Education
 Florida Education Association, in the United States
 Future Educators Association, former name of Educators Rising, US
 School of Economics, Business and Accounting of the University of São Paulo

Sport
 Athletics Federation of Equatorial Guinea
 Ecuadorian Athletics Federation

Government
 Executive Order 8802, also known as the Fair Employment Act, in the US
 Federal Energy Administration, of the US government
 Federal enterprise architecture, the US reference enterprise architecture of a federal government
 Foreign Economic Administration, a US federal agency active during World War II

People
 Carlo Fea (1753–1836), Italian archaeologist
 Leonardo Fea (1852–1903), Italian naturalist
 William Fea (1898–1988), New Zealand rugby union player

Science and technology
 FEA (cable system), a telecommunications cable
 Field emitter array, a particular form of large-area field electron source
 Finite element analysis, a method for solving problems of engineering and mathematical models

Other uses
 Featherstone railway station, in England
 Fire Emblem Awakening, a video game
 French Equatorial Africa, 1910–1958 federation of French colonial possessions
 Fea, in Irish mythology; see Nemain § Kinship
FEA, Freestyle Elite Agency, an italian freestyle music group